Minerva Glacier is a tongue-shaped glacier that flows northwest into the valley between Tentacle Ridge and Gorgons Head in the Cook Mountains. It was named by the New Zealand Antarctic Place-Names Committee after the goddess Minerva, in association with the names from Greek mythology grouped in this area.

References

Glaciers of the Ross Dependency